The 2014 Odlum Brown Vancouver Open was a professional tennis tournament played on outdoor hard courts. It was the 10th edition, for men, and 13th edition, for women, of the tournament and part of the 2014 ATP Challenger Tour and the 2014 ITF Women's Circuit, offering totals of $100,000, for men, and $100,000, for women, in prize money. It took place in West Vancouver, British Columbia, Canada between July 28 to August 3, 2014.

Men's singles main-draw entrants

Seeds

1 Rankings are as of July 21, 2014

Other entrants
The following players received wildcards into the singles main draw:
 Dennis Novikov
 Alexander Sarkissian
 Jordan Thompson
 Rik de Voest

The following players received entry from the qualifying draw:
 Marcos Giron
 Jason Jung
 Connor Smith
 Fritz Wolmarans

The following players entered the singles main draw with a special exempt:
 Thanasi Kokkinakis
 James Ward

Women's singles main-draw entrants

Seeds

1 Rankings are as of July 21, 2014

Other entrants
The following players received wildcards into the singles main draw:
 Khristina Blajkevitch
 Gloria Liang
 Asia Muhammad
 Maria Sanchez

The following players received entry from the qualifying draw:
 Jennifer Brady
 Samantha Crawford
 Allie Will
 Marcela Zacarías

Champions

Men's singles

 Marcos Baghdatis def.  Farrukh Dustov, 7–6(8–6), 6–3

Women's singles

 Jarmila Gajdošová def.  Lesia Tsurenko, 3–6, 6–2, 7–6(7–3)

Men's doubles

 Austin Krajicek /  John-Patrick Smith def.  Marcus Daniell /  Artem Sitak, 6–3, 4–6, [10–8]

Women's doubles

 Asia Muhammad /  Maria Sanchez def.  Jamie Loeb /  Allie Will, 6–3, 1–6, [10–8]

External links
Official website

Odlum Brown Vancouver Open
Odlum Brown Vancouver Open
Vancouver Open
Odlum Brown Vancouver Open
Odlum Brown Vancouver Open
Odlum Brown Vancouver Open